Embassy of South Korea, Bangkok, a diplomatic mission of the Republic of Korea to the Kingdom of Thailand, is located at No.23 Thiam Ruam Mit Road, Ratchadapisek, Huai Khwang District, Bangkok. The mission was opened as a Legation following the establishment of diplomatic relations between South Korea and Thailand in 1958. After promoted to the status of Embassy in 1960, it changed its location a few times and moved into the current address in 1990. The Korean Embassy, led by an Ambassador extraordinary and plenipotentiary, is divided into several sections tasked with different affairs like politic, economic, culture and defence diplomacy.

History
The formal Korean-Thai relations was established on 1 October 1958, and the two countries issued a joint statement to exchange diplomatic missions on the same day. It was announced on 20 January 1959 that Choe Deok-sin, then Ambassador to Saigon, South Vietnam, would concurrently accredited to Thailand as an Envoy in order to head the new Korean Legation in Bangkok, which was promoted to full status of Embassy on 30 August 1960, with Yu Jae-hung being South Korea's first Ambassador stationed in Thailand. The Embassy was located on 349, Silon Road right after its opening, later it operated on several locations including No. 181, South Sathorn Road and 6th floor, Prapawit Building, No. 28/1 Surasak Road. In 1990, the Embassy finally moved into the new compound on Thiam Ruam Mit Road, within which the structures were built with Korean-style, and the main building was designed by architect Kim Joong-up.

Offices & Sections

The South Korean Embassy in Bangkok has subordinate units including the Political Section, Economic Section, Consular Section, Culture and Public Information Section, General Affairs Section and a Defense Attaché Office. The Political and Economic Sections are responsible to conduct political/economic-related diplomatic negotiations and cooperation with the Thai government, investigating/reporting situations about Thai politics/economy and foreign policies. They also work together with political/economic-related international organizations or investigate/report activities concerning these kinds of organization.

The responsibility of the Consular Section includes the protection for South Koreans abroad, and deals with passport, conscription, consular confirmation, civil affairs and visa services. The Culture and Public Information Section carries out introductions for Korean culture in Thailand, promotion of national image, and the interchange of public opinion between the two countries. The General Affairs Section, acting as the managing department for the Embassy's operation, is in charge of administrative affairs including personnel, budget, paperwork, security and compound managements. Defense Attaché Office enhances the Korean-Thai defence diplomacy, military exchange and cooperation.

Heads of mission

See also
South Korea–Thailand relations
List of diplomatic missions of South Korea
List of diplomatic missions in Thailand

References 

South Korea–Thailand relations
Bangkok
Korea, South
Huai Khwang district